Jozef Švec (born 8 October 1995) is a Slovak professional ice hockey player who is currently playing for JKH GKS Jastrzębie of the Polska Hokej Liga.

Career statistics

Regular season and playoffs

References

External links

 

1995 births
Living people
HK Dukla Trenčín players
HK Dubnica players
HK 95 Panthers Považská Bystrica players
Slovak ice hockey left wingers
Sportspeople from Trenčín
JKH GKS Jastrzębie players
Slovak expatriate sportspeople in Poland
Expatriate ice hockey players in Poland
Slovak expatriate ice hockey people